Verny (masculine), Vernaya (feminine), or Vernoye (neuter) is the name of several rural localities in Russia:
Verny, Republic of Bashkortostan, a village in Kaltymanovsky Selsoviet of Iglinsky District of the Republic of Bashkortostan
Verny, Belgorod Oblast, a khutor in Tishansky Rural Okrug of Volokonovsky District of Belgorod Oblast
Verny, Saratov Oblast, a settlement in Pitersky District of Saratov Oblast
Verny, Stavropol Krai, a khutor under the administrative jurisdiction of the Town of Novoalexandrovsk in Novoalexandrovsky District of Stavropol Krai
Vernoye, a selo in Ukrainsky Rural Settlement of Seryshevsky District of Amur Oblast